is a railway station in Kiyosato in the city of Hokuto, Yamanashi Prefecture, Japan. Kiyosato Station serves as the gateway to the surrounding highland resort area as well as the Kiyosato Educational Experiment Program (KEEP), a Summer camp, agricultural training and conference center established in 1938 by American missionary Paul Rusch.

Lines
Kiyosato Station is served by the Koumi Line and is 17.5 kilometers from the terminus of the line at Kobuchizawa Station.

Station layout
The station consists of two ground-level opposed side platforms, connected by a level crossing.  The station has a Midori no Madoguchi staffed ticket office.

Platforms

History
Kiyosato Station was opened on 27 July 1933 by the Japanese Government Railways. With the privatization of Japanese National Railways (JNR) on 1 April 1987, the station came under the control of JR East.

Passenger statistics
In fiscal 2015, the station was used by an average of 219 passengers daily (boarding passengers only).

Surrounding area
Kiyosato Modern Art Museum
Japan National Route 141

See also
 List of railway stations in Japan

References

External links

Kiyosato Station (JR East)

Railway stations in Yamanashi Prefecture
Stations of East Japan Railway Company
Railway stations in Japan opened in 1933
Koumi Line
Hokuto, Yamanashi